Philosophy of love is the field of social philosophy and ethics that attempts to explain the nature of love.

Current theories

There are many different theories that attempt to explain what love is, and what function it serves. It would be very difficult to explain love to a hypothetical person who had not himself or herself experienced love or being loved. In fact, to such a person love would appear to be quite strange if not outright irrational behavior. Among the prevailing types of theories that attempt to account for the existence of love there are: psychological theories, the vast majority of which consider love to be very healthy behavior. Psychologists like Eric Erikson for example who believed that finding intimacy was a necessary part of human development. There are evolutionary theories that hold that love is part of the process of natural selection; there are spiritual theories that may, for instance consider love to be a gift from God; there are also theories that consider love to be an unexplainable mystery, very much like a mystical experience.

Western traditions

Classical roots
Setting aside Empedocles's view of Eros as the force binding the world together, the roots of the classical philosophy of love go back to Plato's Symposium. Plato's Symposium digs deeper into the idea of love and bringing different interpretations and points of view in order to define love. From its riches, we may perhaps single out three main threads that would continue to reverberate through the centuries that followed.
The idea of two loves, one heavenly, one earthly. As Uncle Toby was informed, over two millennia later, "of these loves, according to Ficinus's comment on Valesius, the one is rational - the other is natural - the first...excites to the desire of philosophy and truth - the second, excites to desire, simply".
Aristophanes's conception of mankind as the product of the splitting in two of an original whole: Freud would later draw on this myth - "everything about these primaeval men was double: they had four hands and four feet, two faces" - to support his theory of the repetition compulsion.
Plato's sublimation theory of love - "mounting upwards...from one to two, and from two to all fair forms, and from fair forms to fair actions, and from fair actions to fair notions, until from fair notions he arrives at the notion of absolute beauty".

Aristotle by contrast placed more emphasis on philia (friendship, affection) than on eros (love); and the relationship of friendship and love would continue to be played out into and through the Renaissance, with Cicero for the Latins pointing out that "it is love (amor) from which the word 'friendship' (amicitia) is derived" Meanwhile, Lucretius, building on the work of Epicurus, had both praised the role of Venus as "the guiding power of the universe", and criticised those who become "love-sick...life's best years squandered in sloth and debauchery".

Eros in greek, also known as Cupid, was the mischievous god of love. He was a companion of the goddess Aphrodite. Eros was known for sparking the flame of love in gods and men. He is known for being portrayed as being armed with a bow and arrows or a flaming torch. He is also known for being disobedient but a loyal child of Aphrodite.

Philia love is the type of friendship love. In Greek, this translated to brotherly love. Aristotle was able to describe three main types of friendships. These were Useful, Pleasurable, and Virtue.  Useful was when a friendship has a benefit  to it which is derived by desire. Pleasurable is based on pleasure that one receives. Lastly Virtue is when it is based on true friendship and not receiving anything from it.

Agape in Greek simply means love. The presence of agape love is when there is goodwill, benevolence, and willful delight in the object of love This type of love does not relate to that of romantic nor sexual. Nor does it refer to Philia type of love where it is a close friendship or brotherly love. What sets this love apart is how it involves the natural actions of spirituality, such as through religiously-guided generosity and compassion to all.

Petrarchism
Among his love-sick targets, Catullus, along with others like Héloïse, would find himself summoned in the 12C to a Love's Assize. From the ranks of such figures, and perhaps also under Islamic influences, would emerge the concept of courtly love; and from that Petrarchism would form the rhetorical/philosophical foundations of romantic love for the early modern world.

French skepticism
Alongside the passion for merging that marked Romantic love, a more sceptical French tradition can be traced from Stendhal onwards. Stendhal's theory of crystallization implied an imaginative readiness for love, which only needed a single trigger for the object to be imbued with every fantasised perfection. Proust went further, singling out absence, inaccessibility or jealousy as the necessary precipitants of love. Lacan would almost parody the tradition with his saying that "love is giving something you haven't got to someone who doesn't exist". A post-Lacanian like Luce Irigaray would then struggle to find room for love in a world that will "reduce the other to the same...emphasizing eroticism to the detriment of love, under the cover of sexual liberation".

Western philosophers of love 
Hesiod
Empedocles
Plato (Symposium)
St Augustine
Thomas Aquinas
Leon Hebreo
Baruch Spinoza
Nicolas Malebranche
Jean-Pierre Rousselot
Antonio Caso Andrade
Sigmund Freud
Søren Kierkegaard - Works of Love
Carl Jung
Anders Nygren
Martin D'Arcy
Irving Singer - Philosophy of Love: A Partial Summing-Up
Arthur Schopenhauer - "Metaphysics of Love"
Thomas Jay Oord
Friedrich Nietzsche
Max Stirner "Egoistic Love" 
Max Scheler "The Nature of Sympathy"
Erich Fromm, author of The Art of Loving
C. S. Lewis, "The Four Loves"
Michel Onfray, author of Théorie du corps amoureux : pour une érotique solaire (2000)
Karl Popper
Jean-Luc Marion, "The Erotic Phenomenon"
Luce Irigaray, "The Way of Love"
bell hooks - All About Love: New Visions
Roger Scruton - Notes from Underground
Carrie Ichikawa Jenkins

Eastern traditions

 Given what Max Weber called the intimate relationship between religion and sexuality, the role of the lingam and yoni in India, or of yin and yang in China, as a structuring form of cosmic polarity based on the male and female principles, is perhaps more comprehensible. By way of maithuna or sacred intercourse, Tantra developed a whole tradition of sacred sexuality, which led in its merger with Buddhism to a view of sexual love as a path to enlightenment: as Saraha put it, "That blissful delight that consists between lotus and vajra...removes all defilements".
 More soberly, the Hindu tradition of friendship as the basis for love in marriage can be traced back to the early times of the Vedas.
 Confucius is sometimes seen as articulating a philosophy (as opposed to religion) of love.

See also

References

Further reading
 Thomas Jay Oord, Defining Love (2010)
 C. S. Lewis, The Allegory of Love (1936)
 Theodor Reik, Psychology of Sex Relations (1961)
 Camille Paglia, Sexual Personae (1992)
 Glen Pettigrove, Forgiveness and Love (Oxford University Press, 2012).
 Thomas Jay Oord, The Nature of Love (2010)

External links
Love and Reasons (Special issue of Essays in Philosophy)
"Philosophy of Love" article in the Internet Encyclopedia of Philosophy
Singer & Santayana On Love
Entry on love in the Stanford Encyclopedia of Philosophy

 
Social philosophy
Social ethics
Love